The Harrisson Ice Rises are a local swelling of the ice surface  west-southwest of Henderson Island, Antarctica, where the Shackleton Ice Shelf overrides an underlying obstruction. The feature was discovered by the Eastern Sledge Party of the Australasian Antarctic Expedition (1911–14) under Douglas Mawson, who named the feature for Charles T. Harrisson, biologist with the expedition.

References

Ice rises of Antarctica
Bodies of ice of Queen Mary Land